Young Hearts is a compilation album by the Steve Miller Band released in September 2003 by Capitol Records.  It is the first single-disc career-spanning compilation for the band, including material from their earliest days through their latest (at the time) album. The album charted at number 37 on Billboard 200 and it peaked at number 93 in the Netherlands.

Track listing
 "Take the Money and Run" – 2:52
 "Abracadabra" (Single version) – 3:41
 "Rock'n Me" – 3:08
 "Swingtown" – 3:39
 "The Joker" – 4:29
 "Livin' in the USA" – 3:47
 "Space Intro" – 1:14
 "Fly Like an Eagle" – 4:06
 "Threshold" – 1:06
 "Jet Airliner" – 4:30
 "Space Cowboy" – 4:59
 "Jungle Love" – 3:10
 "Serenade" – 3:15
 "Cry, Cry, Cry" – 4:09
 "Shubada Du Ma Ma" – 5:44
 "Wide River" – 3:59
 "Wild Mountain Honey" – 4:54
 "The Stake" – 3:34
 "My Dark Hour" – 2:38
 "Who Do You Love" – 2:50
 "I Want to Make the World Turn Around" – 4:31
 "Dance Dance Dance" – 2:21

Certifications

References

2003 greatest hits albums
Steve Miller Band compilation albums
Capitol Records compilation albums